Edgar Leo "Eight Rock" Birdine, also spelled Burdene and Burdine, (March 23, 1895 – May 21, 1960) was an American baseball pitcher, outfielder, and third baseman in the Negro leagues. He played with the Memphis Red Sox and Birmingham Black Barons from 1927 to 1932.

References

External links
 and Seamheads

Baltimore Elite Giants players
Memphis Red Sox players
1895 births
1960 deaths
Baseball players from Texas
Baseball outfielders
Baseball pitchers
Baseball third basemen
20th-century African-American sportspeople